Mirusuvil is a town in the north Sri Lankan city of present it is in the High Security Zone which includes Muhamalai the check-point which collapsed after the tensions between Government security forces and the LTTE in late 2006 which ended in the closure of the A9 road. Mirusuvil lies on the Front Defense Line and together with Nagar Kovil.

Towns in Jaffna District
Thenmarachchi DS Division